Baneh Yekkeh (also known as Banī Yak and Banī Yekkeh) is a village in Hana Rural District, Abadeh Tashk District, Neyriz County, Fars Province, Iran. At the 2006 census, its population was 505, in 111 families.

References 

Populated places in Abadeh Tashk County